Abdelkarim Nafti (born 3 August 1981 in Sfax) is a Tunisian football player. He plays as an attacking midfielder or sometimes a winger . He can also plays as a striker.

He joined African giants Al-Merrikh in 2009. His first goal for El-Merreikh was against Hilal Kadougli when El-Merreikh won 2-4 in Kadougli.
In August 2013, he moved to Maltese side Valletta F.C. from Club Africain.

Nafti also played for CS Sfaxien and Al-Nasr in Saudi Arabia.

In addition, he played for the Tunisia national football team.

References

1981 births
Living people
Tunisian footballers
CS Sfaxien players
Club Africain players
Valletta F.C. players
Tunisia international footballers
Tunisian expatriate footballers
Expatriate footballers in Sudan
Expatriate footballers in Malta
Al-Merrikh SC players
Association football forwards
Association football wingers
Association football midfielders
Balzan F.C. players
Maltese Premier League players